is a style of Karate, based on Tani-ha Shitō-ryū, a branch of Shitō-ryū developed by Chōjirō Tani in the late 1940s, and refined by his students, including Yamada Haruyoshi and Kimura Shigeru.

History
Chōjirō Tani (谷 長治郎 Tani Chōjirō) was born in 1921, and started his formal karate training under Miyagi Chōjun, who founded the Gojū-ryū style, while a student at the Doshisha University in Kyoto. After a few months, Miyagi Chōjun returned to Okinawa and the founder of Shitō-ryū, and recommended Mabuni Kenwa to Tani Chōjirō to carry on his learning.  Upon graduating from university, Tani began learning Shuri-te and then Shitō-ryū from Mabuni as well. After many years of training under Mabuni and becoming one of his most senior students, Tani received the certificate of succession from him and became the head of Shitō-ryū, enabling him to use the name Tani-ha Shitoryu.

Chōjirō Tani began teaching the Karate style Shūkōkai (meaning the way for all) at a dojo in Kobe, Japan, in 1946. Shūkōkai was designed around the study of body mechanics, is very fast due to its relatively high stance aiding mobility, and is known for the double hip twist, which maximises the force of its strikes; making it one of the most hard-hitting Karate styles.

One of Tani's most senior students, Sensei Shigeru Kimura, left Japan in 1965 to teach Shūkōkai in Africa.  He developed Shukokai even further, emphasizing its power and strength; and was regarded as an expert on the style.  He continued to teach after travelling to Europe, before settling in the United States in 1970 at the age of 29, where he taught at Yonezuka's Cranford dojo for two years; creating the first Shukokai World Tournament in 1981.  Sensei Kimura died of a heart attack at the age of 54.  Tani died on 11 January 1998.

Kata 
Jion kata group which includes Jion and Jinn
Pinan Nidan
Pinan Shodan
Pinan Sandan
Pinan Yondan (also called Pinan Shidan)
Pinan Godan
Bassai Dai
Seienchin
Shiho Zuki
Jurokono
Chinte
Matsukaze
Saifa
Annanku
Shio Kosokan
Sōchin
Seipai
Tensho (kata)
Sanchin
Bassai Sho
Nijūshiho
Seriu
Chintō
Tomoro no passai
Na-Pa-Pu
Kurunnfa
kosokun dai
Supa Impa

Branches
Shūkōkai has evolved into several independent style branches throughout the world over the past few decades:
 Kimura Shukokai grew out of the Shūkōkai school taught since 1978 in Hackensack, New Jersey, United States and later in Tenafly, New Jersey by Shigeru Kimura, a long time student of Tani. After Kimura's death in 1995, this international organization was formed to promote his style, co-led by his four senior students: Eddie Daniels, head of Shukokai Karate Federation, Bill Bressaw, head of American Shukokai Karate Union, Chris Thompson and Lionel Marinus of South Africa.
 Sankukai, founded in 1971 in Paris, France, by Yoshinao Nanbu, a student of Chōjirō Tani. Yoshinao Nanbu abandoned the style to create Nanbudō in 1978, and Sankukai is currently taught by several national organizations throughout the world.
 Kawata-ha Seikukai Karate founded in Kawanishi, Hyōgo, Japan after the death of Chōjirō Tani in 1998 by Kawata Shigemasa, his most senior student

References

Shitō-ryū
Okinawan kobudo
Japanese martial arts